Lori Wallach (born 1965) is the Director of Rethink Trade at the American Economic Liberties Project and a senior advisor to the Citizens Trade Campaign, the U.S. labor-environment-faith-consumer-family farm coalition. She launched Public Citizen's trade program in 1991, and founded Global Trade Watch (GTW), a division of Public Citizen, in 1995, leading GTW until 2021. Wallach has testified before Congress about the effects of NAFTA, WTO, and other trade policies.

Education and early career
Wallach, a native of Wisconsin, is Jewish and was born in 1964. She graduated from Wellesley College in 1986 with a B.A. in political science. She then attended Harvard Law School, where she received her J.D. in 1990. Wallach attended Harvard at the same time as Michael Froman, a future Trade Representative; the two have been described as long-time rivals by The New York Times. Before starting her role in 1995 at Public Citizen, she had worked on Capitol Hill, on electoral campaigns, and in television news.

Career 
Wallach was an opponent of the Trans-Pacific Partnership (TPP), arguing that the TPP would lead to job losses in over a dozen sectors while only delivering "miniscule gains in economic growth." Wallach criticized the methodology of a study that found the TPP would benefit the U.S. economically. In 2012, Wallach described the TPP as "NAFTA on steroids", deriding the proposal as a "corporate Trojan horse".

In a 2021 op-ed for the Washington Post, Wallach endorsed waiving intellectual property (IP) restrictions on COVID-19 vaccines in order to boost the global vaccination effort.

Recognition
Wallach has appeared on MSNBC, CNN, NPR, ABC, CNBC, Fox News, PBS, Bloomberg TV, BBC and C-SPAN. In addition, she has been quoted extensively in publications such as The New York Times, The Economist, Forbes, The Washington Post, The Wall Street Journal, Financial Times, USA Today, Bloomberg, and The National Journal. She is also a frequent contributor to the Huffington Post, Democracy Now, and PBS.

She has been described by the Wall Street Journal as, "Ralph Nader with a sense of humor" and was dubbed "the Trade Debate's Guerrilla Warrior" in a National Journal profile. In 2016, she was named by Politico as one of 50 "thinkers, doers and visionaries, transforming American politics." Representative Rosa DeLauro praised Wallach's "granular knowledge" and stated that Wallach is her "source of information and knowledge."

Publications
 1999: The WTO: Five Years of Reasons to Resist Corporate Globalization 
 2004: Whose Trade Organization?: The Comprehensive Guide to the WTO 
 2013: The Rise and Fall of Fast Track Trade Authority - Updated and Expanded Edition

References

External links

1965 births
Harvard Law School alumni
Living people
Wellesley College alumni
Writers from Wisconsin